Michael Roswell Barlow (born April 30, 1948) is a retired professional baseball player who played seven seasons for the St. Louis Cardinals, Houston Astros, Los Angeles Angels, and Toronto Blue Jays of Major League Baseball.

Early life
Barlow was born in the small town of Stamford in Upstate New York, where he lived on a large farm with two sisters.

Career
After playing basketball at Milford High School in Oneonta, New York, Barlow played basketball at Syracuse University, before switching to baseball after his sophomore year. In 1969, he played collegiate summer baseball with the Harwich Mariners of the Cape Cod Baseball League. After Syracuse discontinued its baseball program after the 1972 season, Barlow signed with the Oakland Athletics organization.

Personal life
Barlow briefly owned a restaurant in Syracuse, New York, and worked as the athletic director at Bishop Grimes Junior/Senior High School from 1998 - June 2011, in East Syracuse.

As of May 2018, Barlow lives in central New York with his wife after having four children together, all four of whom played a sport in college, including Chris Barlow, who was drafted from LeMoyne College by the Montreal Expos in the 9th round of the 2002 MLB June Amateur Draft, and then played for three summers in their organization.

Barlow also has five grandchildren.

References

External links

1948 births
Living people
American expatriate baseball players in Canada
Baseball players from New York (state)
Birmingham A's players
Burlington Bees players
California Angels players
Coos Bay-North Bend A's players
Harwich Mariners players
Houston Astros players
Key West Conchs players
Major League Baseball pitchers
Memphis Blues players
People from Stamford, New York
St. Louis Cardinals players
Salt Lake City Gulls players
Syracuse Chiefs players
Syracuse Orangemen baseball players
Toronto Blue Jays players
Tucson Toros players
Tulsa Oilers (baseball) players
Syracuse Orange men's basketball players